On the Other Ocean is the debut studio album by American composer David Behrman, released in 1978 by Lovely Music, Ltd. Considered a pioneering work in the genre of computer music, the album pairs computers with live players.

Background and recording
"On the Other Ocean" was recorded on September 18, 1977 at the Recording Studio, Center for Contemporary Music, Mills College in Oakland, California.

"Figure in a Clearing" was recorded on June 9, 1977 at the Electronic Music Studio, State University of New York at Albany in Albany, New York.

Release
The album was reissued by Lovely Music in 1996 on CD and again on vinyl on February 1, 2019.

Critical reception

In a retrospective review, Andy Beta of Pitchfork said, "Over 40 years after its initial release, the composer's pioneering work pairing computers with live players feels not only prescient but also refreshingly optimistic." Nilan Perera of Exclaim! praised the record, saying, "What both pieces excel in is a rich, organic, complexity that on the surface may be considered "ambient," but eschews that convention in the most artful way. This recording has achieved landmark status in New Music and it's easy to hear why."

Accolades

Legacy and influence

An excerpt of "On the Other Ocean" was featured on Late Night Tales: Belle and Sebastian Vol. II. a 2012 compilation album by Scottish band Belle and Sebastian.

On April 16, 2017, Robin Pecknold of Fleet Foxes selected "On the Other Ocean" in his "Bedtime Mix" on Phil Taggart's BBC Radio 1.

American choreographer Molissa Fenley has used "On the Other Ocean" and "Figure in a Clearing" in her choreography work.

Track listing

Personnel
Credits adapted from liner notes.

 David Behrman – composition, electronics
 Arthur Stidfole – bassoon 
 "Blue" Gene Tyranny – engineering 
 Maggi Payne – flute 
 David Gibson – cello 
 Richard Lainhart – engineering 
 Ariel Peeri – jacket design

References

1978 debut albums
David Behrman albums
Lovely Music albums
Minimalistic compositions
1977 compositions